Marianne Vere Cardale de Schrimpff is a Colombian anthropologist, archaeologist, academic and writer.

Biography 
Marianne Cardale obtained her master's degree at the University of Edinburgh in 1965 and her PhD in 1972 at the University of Oxford with a thesis named Techniques of Hand-weavíng and allied arts in Colombia. From 1970 to 1974 she worked at the Universidad de Los Andes in Bogotá.

Cardale de Schrimpff has been active in the establishment of the Calima Gold Museum in Cali, in the region of the Calima. She also co-founded the Pro Calima group on the Calima culture. Part of her work was on the Malagana culture, about pre-Columbian roads, and other aspects of the Calima culture. Schrimpff has written about the Herrera Period, the Muisca people and their salt production in the Eastern Ranges of the Colombian Andes and about textiles in different parts of the country.

Cardale de Schrimpff has worked with other Muisca scholars and archaeologists in Colombia, including Sylvia Broadbent, Gonzalo Correal Urrego, Ana María Groot, and Leonor Herrera.

Cardale de Schrimpff speaks English, Spanish, French and German.

Her maiden name is Cardale, and "de Schrimpff" refers to her husband, aerial photographer Rudolf Schrimpff. He died on March 30, 2005 in an aviation accident.

Works 
Cardale de Schrimpff has published many books and articles about the Calima, Muisca, Panche, and other indigenous groups of Colombia, in Spanish and English.

Selected books 
 2015 - Archaeology of Salt, chapter Pre-Columbian Salt Production in Colombia - searching for the evidence
 2000 - Caminos precolombinos: las vías, los ingenieros y los viajeros (with Leonor Herrera)
 1996 - Caminos prehispánicos en Calima: El estudio de caminos precolombinos de la cuenca del alto río Calima, Cordillera Occidental, Valle del Cauca
 1992 - Calima : diez mil años de historia en el suroccidente de Colombia
 1981 - Las salinas de Zipaquirá: su explotación indígena

Selected articles 
 2013 - Human Occupation and the Environment during the Holocene in the River Cauca Valley, Colombia. The Evidence from Paleobotany and from Soil Studies (with Neil Duncan, Ana María Groot, Pedro Botero, Alejandra Betancourt & Juan Carlos Berrio
 2006 - Cazando animales en el bestiario cosmológico: el cocodrilo en el suroeste de Colombia y en regiones vecinas del Ecuador (800 A.C. a 500 D.C.)
 2006 - Estudio de los restos humanos y de fauna del sitio arqueológico Hacienda Malagana (with Gonzalo Correal Urrego, Leonor Herrera & Carlos Armando Rodríguez)
 1990 - La agricultura y el manejo de la tierra en tiempos prehispánicos
 1989 - Ornamentos y máscaras de oro dela cultura Ilama, metalurgia del periodo formativo tardio en la cordillera occidental colombiana (with Warwick Bray, Leonor Herrera & Adriana Arias De Hassan)
 1988 - Textiles arqueológicos del bajo rio San Jorge
 1981 - Ocupaciones humanas en el Altiplano Cundiboyacense
 1976 - Investigaciones arqueológicas en la zona de Pubenza, Tocaima, Cundinamarca
 1974 - Mitología Cuna: Los Kalu según Don Alfonso Díaz Granadas (with Leonor Herrera)

Notable works

See also 

List of Muisca scholars
Muisca
Muisca agriculture
Calima culture

References 

Year of birth missing (living people)
Living people
Colombian anthropologists
20th-century Colombian historians
Women historians
Colombian archaeologists
20th-century Colombian women scientists
Colombian women archaeologists
Colombian women anthropologists
Muisca scholars
University of Los Andes (Colombia) alumni
Alumni of the University of Oxford
Alumni of the University of Edinburgh
21st-century Colombian historians